The following is a list of recipients of the Nandi Award for Best Lyricist commissioned since 1977:

Winners

References

Lyrics